The Chilean Iron Belt is a geological province rich in iron ore deposits in northern Chile. It extends as a north-south beld along the western part of the Chilean regions of Coquimbo and Atacama, chiefly between the cities of La Serena and Taltal. The belt follows much of the Atacama Fault System and is about 600 km long and 25 km broad.

Iron oxide-apatite, iron oxide copper gold ore deposits (IOCG) and manto-type copper and silver are the main types of deposits. Iron-apatite and IOCG are considered to have different origins. Manto-type deposits are concentrated in the northern part of the belt and are chiefly emplaced on rocks of La Negra Formation.

The ores of the Chilean Iron Belt formed in separate pulses in the Cretaceous period as result of magmatic and hydrothermal processes. At least part of the iron oxide-apatite rock originated from molten iron in the form of lava, tephra. and intrusions. Thus iron oxide apatite magma cooled into rock variously from surface volcanoes to depths of 10 km over even more.

Some geologists have speculated that a large meteorite impact in the Pacific during the Cretaceous period may have set in motion a series of tectonic changes that led to the formation the ores.

Iron mines along the Chilean Iron Belt
El Carmen
Los Colorados
El Algarrobo
El Tofo (defunct)
El Romeral

References

Cretaceous Chile
Cretaceous magmatism
Belt regions
Iron ore deposits
Iron mining in Chile
Metallogenetic provinces
Mines in Antofagasta Region
Mines in Atacama Region
Mines in Coquimbo Region
Geology of Antofagasta Region
Geology of Atacama Region
Geology of Coquimbo Region